Lwandile Nkanyuza (born 30 June 1995), known professionally as ByLwansta, is a South African rapper, record producer, art director and graphic designer.

From very early in his career, graphic design has played a very significant role in Lwandile's music career as ByLwansta, and he often sees and treats ByLwansta as a client with a never ending brief. In 2016, Nkanyuza wrote his final Graphic Design research paper on The Significance of Visual Communication on the Consumption of Music in the Digital Age, for which he was awarded a distinction.

He is the first South African artist to appear on COLORS, and the second African artist after Nigerian singer, songwriter and record producer, Davido.

Early life 
Nkanyuza was born in Kokstad, South Africa. He attended St Patrick's College, where his major subjects were Computer Applications Technology, Visual Art and History. After completing his secondary education in 2013, he relocated to Durban, KwaZulu-Natal the following year to pursue a Bachelor of Arts in Graphic Design. at Pearson Institute of Higher Education.

He is the younger brother of South African singer, songwriter and record producer Kimosabe.

Having been introduced to Hip Hop at the age of 8, Nkanyuza informally began his musical journey in 2008, writing and recording music from the backroom of his mother's house which they called Da59 Recordings studio, founded by his brother.

It wasn't until 2014, following the move to Durban, where he would begin to establish and develop a new approach to his music, incorporating with it his passion for visual communications and graphic design and ultimately establishing his creative brand, NORMVL under which he creates his music and its various creative counterparts.

Career

NORMVL (2014–15) 
After moving to Durban to study graphic design, Nkanyuza found himself on very unfamiliar ground, this being the first time he's lived away from his home in Kokstad. His dorm room would become his sanctuary where introspection would become second nature. This would fuel a new approach to songwriting.

It would be during this time, while maintaining a general student life, Nkanyuza would begin working on his NORMVL Mixtape He would use production software FL Studio and Cubase to create the mixtape. His housemates would often stand at his door while he recorded in the evenings, eventually knocking at his door, curious about his evening activities.

Using knowledge gained through his course, Nkanyuza was able to independently package hard copies of NORMVL in his room, over and above designing the cover art. His studies not only aided him in understanding the technicalities of package design, but branding as a whole.

NORMVL would enjoy mild success and press on local online music publications, often being praised for its raw quality and its relatability. NORMVL would go on to earn a nomination at the South African Hip Hop Awards 2014 for Mixtape of the Year, as well as 3 nods from Durban's Original Material Awards 2014 in the categories Mixtape of the Year, Lyricist of the Year and Best Sleeve Design.

Your Absolutely Right EP, Hype Magazine & COLORS (2016–17) 
Following the release of the NORMVL Mixtape, Nkanyuza would release his second official musical offering, titled Your Absolutely Right EP, 2 year later. The EP was produced in his same college dorm room, again using FL Studio and Cubase.

The EP received generally positive reviews from critics and listeners a like. The EP was eventually listed on OkayAfrica's The 15 Best South African Hip-Hop Albums of 2016 and Texx And The City's Top 20 Albums & EPs Of 2016. Texx And The City writer Timothy Kohler stated that "..although ByLwansta’s debut may resemble a young Marshall Mathers, the artist endlessly emphasizes the importance of bona fide authenticity. Similar or not, the intention’s what counts."

The EP's release coincided with the launch of his self-designed personal artist website in which a SoundCloud player to the EP was embedded, a digital booklet was available for download and a link to the lyrics hosted through Genius was available as a button. The EP's download link crashed within 30 minutes of the release due to excessive traffic. In NORMVL fashion, Nkanyuza would package hard copies of the EP in his room which he would sell at shows or take online orders and post them to their buyers.

In February 2017, Nkanyuza would appear on the cover of South Africa's No.1 Hip Hop Magazine, Hype Magazine's The Freshman Edition, as one of 7 freshmen. Durban Is Yours would go on to list him as one of 10 Durban Acts To Watch in 2017

In August 2017, Nkanyuza would visit Berlin, Germany for 10 days as one of 10 recipients of the Goethe Talents Scholarship 2017 coordinated by the Goethe Institut and Pop-Kultur Festival. While in Berlin, Nkanyuza recorded a session with popular music and culture YouTube channel, COLORS Berlin, where he would perform a rendition of his 2014 single, Lindiwe from the NORMVL Mixtape. He has stated to have been loyal follower of the channel and would watch and listen to it religiously, after first discovering American rapper, Oddisee's session on the channel. He is the first South African artist to appear on the channel, and second African artist after Nigerian singer, songwriter and record producer, Davido.

SPIJØNGET (2019–present)

Personal life and side projects 
Nkanyuza graphic designs and offers art direction and visual communication services under NORMVL. After having gained tremendous insight through his research on visual communication in music for his college research paper, he has since designed cover artwork for various artists in Durban, in various genres such as hip hop, jazz, afro-pop, folk and RnB.

He officially graduated from Pearson Institute of Higher Education in April 2018.

Nkanyuza has a small collection of CDs, a majority of which he orders online due to the lack of availability in local music stores. He does this to unpack and analyse the sleeve designs and find the designers and art directors behind them. His favorite cover artwork designs are for Madvillain's (MF DOOM and Madlib) Madvillainy, by Jeff Jank and Eric Coleman, and Kanye West's 808s & HeartBreak by Brian Donnelly.

He is a huge fan of T-Pain's music and cultural impact, and of Lana Del Rey's music, and has hardcopies of all 4 of her major releases.

Nkanyuza cites Eminem, 50 Cent, Lana Del Rey, Tyler the Creator, Anderson Paak, Frank Ocean, Lil Wayne, MF DOOM, Kendrick Lamar, Kanye West, AKA and Al Jarreau as influences on his musical identity and performance.

Discography

Studio albums 

 SPIJØNGET (2022)

Mixtapes 

 NORMVL (2014)

Extended plays 

 Your Absolutely Right EP (2016)

Awards and nominations

External links 
 Official website
 ByLwansta on Twitter
 ByLwansta's SoundCloud

References 

Living people
1995 births
South African hip hop musicians
South African rappers
South African graphic designers